Florence  is a city in and the county seat of Florence County, South Carolina, United States. It lies at the intersection of Interstates 20 and 95 and is the eastern terminus of the former. It is the primary city within the Florence metropolitan area. The area forms the core of the historical "Pee Dee" region of South Carolina, which includes the eight counties of northeastern South Carolina, along with sections of southeastern North Carolina. As of the 2020 census, the population of Florence was 39,899.

Florence is one of the major cities in South Carolina. In 1965, Florence was named an All-American City, presented by the National Civic League. The city was founded as a railroad hub and became the junction of three major railroad systems, including the Wilmington and Manchester, the Northeastern, and the Cheraw and Darlington.

History
The City of Florence was chartered in 1871 by the Reconstruction government and incorporated in 1890 following the 1888 creation of Florence County. Prior to its charter, the city was part of one of the original townships laid out by the Lords Proprietors in 1719. The area was gradually settled through the late 19th and early 20th century. Early settlers practiced subsistence farming and produced indigo, cotton, naval stores and timber, which were shipped down the Great Pee Dee River to the port at Georgetown and exported. In the mid-19th century two intersecting railroads were built, the Wilmington and Manchester, and the Northeastern. Gen. W. W. Harllee, the president of the W & M, built his home at the junction, and named the community "Florence", after his daughter.

American Civil War
During the Civil War, the town was an important supply and railroad repair center for the Confederacy, and the site of the Florence Stockade, which held between 12,000 and 18,000 Union prisoners of war. Over 2,800 of the prisoners died of disease, and the burial ground adjacent to the prison became the Florence National Cemetery after the war and now has expanded.

Early 20th century
After the war, Florence grew and prospered, using the railroad to supply its cotton, timber, and by the turn of the century, tobacco. During the 20th century the economy of Florence came to rely heavily on the healthcare industry, driven by two major hospitals and a number of pharmaceutical plants. Industry grew, especially after World War II, when Florence became increasingly known for textiles, pharmaceuticals, paper, and manufacturing, in addition to agricultural products.

Geography

Florence is located in the coastal plain of South Carolina. It is in the northeastern part of the state and the northern part of Florence County. Jeffries Creek is a tributary of the Great Pee Dee River and is the main waterway that flows through the city, passing south of the city center.

Climate
The climate experienced is humid subtropical (Köppen: Cfa) of the type found in the deep south, especially far from the coast. Autumn, winter and spring are mild, with occasional winter nights below freezing but rarely features extended cold and rigorous conditions. Florence's summers can be very hot and humid. The city, like others in the Southeast, is prone to inversions, which trap ozone and other pollutants over the area.

Government
The city of Florence has a council-manager form of government. City council members are elected every four years, without term limits. The council consists of seven members (three from districts and three at-large), as well as the mayor. The council responsible for making policies and enacting laws, rules and regulations in order to provide for future community and economic growth. The council additionally provides the necessary support for the orderly and efficient operation of city services. Florence holds elections for mayor every four years, alongside national Presidential elections. Mayors serve as a member of the city council, without term limits. The council appoints a city manager to serve as chief administrative officer to run the day-to-day business of the city and to serve at the pleasure of the council.

Current members of the Florence City Council:

Economy
During the latter part of the 20th century and early 21st century, Florence's economy was transformed from being based largely on rail and farming into a diversified economy as the major commerce, finance, rail and trucking services, health care, and industrial center of the Eastern Carolinas. There are over nine foreign affiliated companies and fourteen Fortune 500 companies in the region. The gross domestic product (GDP) of the Florence metropolitan statistical area  was $6.8 billion, one of the highest among MSAs in the state.

Milken Institute 2008 Best Performing Cities Index showed the Florence MSA as the 5th largest gainer in their evaluation of the top 124 small metropolitan areas in the United States. The report ranks U.S. metropolitan areas by how well they are creating and sustaining jobs and economic growth. The components include job, wage and salary and technology growth.

Florence has blossomed into a strong center for medical care, with four major medical providers McLeod Regional Medical Center, Medical University of South Carolina Hospital, Regency Hospital and HealthSouth. The growth of these providers has led to the transformation of the Florence skyline over the last 10 years, with development for demand with multi-story high-rises as well as community relation projects.

With such a strong medical community several companies have their global, continental, or national headquarters in Florence, including GE Healthcare manufacturing operations (MRI manufacturing), TRICARE, a supplemental insurance company that serves the US Armed Forces and its civilian employees, and Assurant, a real property and personal insurance company. The city also serves the pharmaceutical industry, with a Patheon pharmaceutical manufacturing facility and research and development center for Patheon API Services.

Florence also serves as the financial and service hub for the Eastern Carolinas, with many financial and professional management institutions invested heavily within the city. Companies with regional operations and headquarters include Truist Financial, Monster.com, Otis Elevator, CSX Transportation, Wells Fargo and Bank of America. Florence has operation headquarters for AT&T and is the southeastern headquarters of Duke Energy Inc.

Florence has benefited from being located at the intersection of I-95 and I-20, approximately halfway between New York City and Miami, Florida. This has allowed Florence to remain competitive and bringing in and sustaining major manufacturers such as, General Electric, Honda, QVC Distribution Center and Otis Elevator.

Education

Public schools
The Florence Public School District One is the governing body of the public schools in the area. , the district has an active enrollment of 14,500 students, attending a total of 20 schools, including 13 elementary schools, 4 middle schools, and 3 high schools serving the City of Florence, Effingham and Quinby areas. The school system also supports an alternative school for middle and/or high school students, a vocational career center, and an adult learning center. The district and its schools have been recognized as being among the state's best with numerous awards, including the Palmetto's Finest Award.

Private schools
 All Saints' Episcopal Day School (PK-6)
 Florence Christian School (PK-12)
 Maranatha Christian School (PK-12)
 Montessori School of Florence (PK-6)
 The King's Academy (PK-12)
 Saint Anthony Catholic School (PK-8)
 Trinity Collegiate School (6-12)

Higher education
Facilities of higher education in and around Florence include Francis Marion University and Florence–Darlington Technical College. Francis Marion University is a public university located in Florence, while Florence–Darlington Technical College, located in Florence, also operates satellite campuses in Hartsville, Lake City and Mullins.

Library
Florence has a public library, a branch of the Florence County Library System. The Florence County Public Library has a room, the South Carolina Room, dedicated to South Carolina history and genealogy.

Healthcare

McLeod Regional Medical Center is a 453-bed non-profit medical center located on a  campus in downtown Florence. The hospital complex in downtown contains the Cardiovascular Institute, the Center for Advanced Surgery, the Cancer Center, and the only specialised paediatrics unit in the northeastern portion of South Carolina. It encompasses acute care facilities, such as McLeod Regional Medical Center in Florence, McLeod Medical Center in Dillon, McLeod Medical Center in Darlington, and also operates campuses all over the Pee Dee region of South Carolina.

The Medical University of South Carolina Florence, formerly Carolinas Hospital System, a regional healthcare facility with 420-beds, serves eight counties in northeastern South Carolina.

Regency Hospital opened in Florence in July 2001. It is a 40-bed Long Term Acute Care (LTAC) hospital located on the fourth and fifth floors of the Cedar Towers, at 121 Cedar Street. Regency, with its corporate office based in Alpharetta, Georgia, has 20 hospitals nationwide, and continues to aggressively grow throughout the country.

McLeod Regional Medical Center and MUSC Florence are the first and third largest employers in the Pee Dee region of South Carolina.

Transportation

Highways
  is a six-lane freeway that enters the city from the northeast, and exits southwest. The highway leads northeast  to Fayetteville, North Carolina, and southwest  to Savannah, Georgia.
  is a four-lane interstate highway, which enters the city from the west and has a terminus in Florence as (David McLeod Blvd ). Interstate 20 leads west  to Columbia, then on to Atlanta and ultimately Texas.
  is a north to south route through the downtown area. The highway crosses Interstate 95 northwest of the downtown area and leads north  to Winston-Salem, North Carolina. To the south it merges with US 301 and eventually leads  to Charleston.
  enters the city from the west at Interstate 95, then merges with David McLeod Blvd at Palmetto Street, and finally exits east of the city at the junction with Freedom Blvd. The road leads southwest  to Sumter and east  to Wilmington, North Carolina.
  offers another northeast to southwest route through Florence. Entering the city merged with US 52 as South Irby Street, it then forms a crescent-shaped bypass around the downtown area as Freedom Boulevard. US 301 then merges with US 76 east of downtown Florence, and exits as such.

Mass transit
The Pee Dee Regional Transportation Authority (PDRTA) is the principal agency responsible for operating mass transit in greater Florence area including Darlington, Marion, Chesterfield, Dillon, and the Lake City area. PDRTA also operates routes to Columbia, Myrtle Beach and Sumter.

PDRTA operates express shuttles, and bus service serving Florence and its immediate surrounding areas. The authority was established in June 1974; it is South Carolina's oldest and largest RTA. PDRTA began operations serving the six-county Pee Dee region of Chesterfield, Darlington, Dillon, Florence, Marion, and Marlboro Counties. The PDRTA has provided transportation for more than 15 million passengers, and transports approximately 2,457 people daily. It operates services with 165 vehicles ranging in size from transit, intercity buses, and trolleys to lift-equipped vans and goshens.

Air
The airport itself is serviced by American Eagle to Charlotte and is the second busiest airport in the region behind Myrtle Beach International Airport. It is located an hour west of Myrtle Beach.

Intercity rail

Amtrak's The Palmetto trains 89, 90 and Silver Meteor (trains 97, 98) connect Florence with the cities of New York, Philadelphia, Wilmington, Baltimore, Washington, Jacksonville, Orlando, and Miami. Additionally the Florence station also serves as the refueling and crew changing point for Amtrak's Auto Train service which operates service between Sanford station in Florida and Lorton station Virginia, Passengers may temporarily disembark the train to smoke, get some air or walk their service animals.

Intercity bus
Greyhound Lines and Southeastern Stages operates a station on Irby Street, in the southern part of downtown, providing Florence with intercity bus transportation.

Downtown revitalization
In 2010, the city of Florence began a massive redevelopment of Downtown Florence. The city has completed several notable projects and has several more planned. The redevelopment of Florence has even created a new branding effort, to include new city department logos (not to be confused with the city seal) way finding signs and repainting of water towers.

The historic downtown district running from the central business district toward the McLeod Medical Center, features a number of historic buildings that have been rehabilitated. The redevelopment started with the $18 million Drs. Bruce and Lee Foundation Library, and today now has the new Florence Little Theater, some 60 new apartments and the Francis Marion University Performing Arts Center which opened in September 2011, as well the new Florence Museum of Art, Science & History which opened October 11, 2014. New office space has emerged from once abandoned buildings, and a police substation was added on once crime-ridden Dargan Street.

Special efforts are being aimed at the downtown area, which was once the center of the city's activity but remains dormant after retailers and shoppers left for suburban malls. The goal is to re-establish Evans as a vibrant commercial and residential corridor, and five blocks of Evans Street will be streetscaped.

People and culture

Demographics

2020 census

As of the 2020 United States Census, there were 39,899 people, 15,624 households, and 9,671 families residing in the city.

2000 census
As of the census of 2000, there were 30,248 people, 11,925 households, and 7,882 families residing in the city. The population density was 1,709.4 people per square mile (659.8/km2). There were 13,090 housing units at an average density of 739.7 per square mile (285.5/km2). The racial makeup of the city was 50.0% White, 46.0% Black or African- American, 0.18% Native American, 1.16% Asian, 0.01% Pacific Islander, 0.21% from other races, and 0.71% from two or more races. Hispanic or Latino people of any race were 0.76% of the population.

There were 11,925 households, out of which 30.2% had children living with them, 41.9% were married couples living together, 20.7% had a female householder with no husband present, and 33.9% were non-families. 29.5% of all households were made up of individuals, and 10.4% had someone living alone who was 65 years of age or older. The average household size was 2.44 and the average family size was 3.03.

In the city, the population was spread out, with 25.0% under the age of 18, 8.7% from 18 to 24, 28.2% from 25 to 44, 23.0% from 45 to 64, and 15.1% who were 65 years of age or older. The median age was 37 years. For every 100 females, there were 82.8 males. For every 100 females age 18 and over, there were 77.5 males.

The median income for a household in the city was $35,388, and the median income for a family was $42,250. Males had a median income of $35,633 versus $23,589 for females. The per capita income for the city was $20,336. Of the population 19.3% and 15.3% of families, and 28.2% of those under and 15.9% of those 65 and older, were living below the poverty line.

Florence is the central city of a metropolitan area with a total population of 205,566 (2010 US census), including the entire populations of Florence and Darlington counties. However, in the more detailed 2000 Census data, only about 54% of this metro was urbanized, consisting of the urban areas Florence (2000 pop.: 67,314), Hartsville (14,907), Darlington (12,066), and Lake City (8,728). The remainder of the Florence metro is considered rural.

Religion
Like other midsize cities in the southern United States, Florence's population is largely dominated by Protestantism, the largest group being the Southern Baptists, followed by the Methodists. The rest of the population are distributed among other Protestant denominations as well as the Roman Catholic and Greek Orthodox Churches. The Greek Orthodox Church holds a large Greek Festival annually in September. There is one Reform Judaism synagogue in Florence, Beth Israel Congregation. There is also a small Hindu temple.

Notable people

Arts
 Blackie Collins, author and knife maker
 Graves of Valor, band
 The Independents, band
 William Johnson, artist
 Taft Jordan, jazz trumpeter
 Matt Laug, drummer
 Trey Lorenz, musician
 Philip B. Meggs, author and historian
 Gillian Murphy, ballet dancer
 Houston Person, musician
 Padgett Powell, author
 Doug Quattlebaum, Piedmont blues guitarist, singer and songwriter
 Ruba Say, musician
 Sequoyah Prep School, band
 Through the Eyes of the Dead, band
 Henry Timrod, so-called "poet laureate of the Confederacy"

Entertainment
 K. Lee Graham, Miss South Carolina Teen USA 2013, Miss Teen USA 2014
 Mark L. Walberg, television host

Politics and law
 Beverly Daggett, politician
 Alvin Greene, politician
 Charles Weston Houck, judge
 William C. James, Marine Brigadier general
 Robin Tallon, politician

Sports
 Michael Allen Anderson, professional baseball outfielder
 Buddy Baker, NASCAR racecar driver
 Ron Barfield Jr., NASCAR racecar driver
 Brandon Bostick, professional football player (NFL)
 Akeem Bostick, professional baseball player (MLB)
 Harry Carson, professional football player (NFL)
 Jim David, professional football player (NFL)
 Fisher DeBerry, football coach
 Darian Durant, professional football player (CFL)
 Justin Durant, professional football player (NFL)
 Malliciah Goodman, professional football player (NFL)
 Clayton Holmes, professional football player (NFL)
 Nick Nelson, professional football player (NFL)
 Reggie Sanders, professional baseball player (MLB)
 Lawrence Timmons, professional football player (NFL)
 Ron Turner, swimming coach
 Cale Yarborough, NASCAR driver, four-time Daytona 500 champion

Sports
Baseball
Baseball has a long history in Florence, dating back to the 1920s when the Florence Swamp Foxes were founded. The minor league Florence Steelers played in Florence from 1948 to 1950. The Toronto Blue Jays had a minor league team that played in Florence from 1981 to 1986. Major league players Pat Borders, Jimmy Key, Cecil Fielder and Fred McGriff made stops in Florence during their minor league careers. Florence's Post 1 American Legion baseball team is one of the longest tenured teams in the state, beginning in 1932. Drawing the best high school talent from all over the Pee Dee area each summer, Post 1 has had over 30 players move on the professional ranks, including Reggie Sanders. They have won over 30 league titles and six state championships. They were the host site of the 2008 American Legion State Tournament. In 2012, Post 1 won the South Carolina state tournament and the Southeast Regional and participated in the American Legion World Series in Shelby, North Carolina.

Florence is home to the Coastal Plain League Florence Flamingos summer collegiate baseball team. Relocated to Florence in 1998, the team brings in players from collegiate sports conferences, including the Southeastern Conference and the Atlantic Coast Conference. The team hosted the 2004 All-Star game and Home Run Derby. In 2007, they hosted the Petitt Cup Tournament at their home field.

The Flamingos play at the 1,755-capacity Sparrow Stadium at Francis Marion University. The stadium is also hosts some home games for the Florence–Darlington Technical College Stingers baseball team. Post 1 plays its home games at American Legion Field, adjacent to Memorial Stadium, where Florence's three public high schools play their home football games.

Carolina Bank Field is a baseball stadium being built as part of the Florence Sports Complex to host the Flamingos starting in 2022.

Football
Until 2009, Florence was home to the American Indoor Football league's Florence Phantoms, which debuted in the league in 2006. The Phantoms played in the Florence Civic Center. Florence Memorial Stadium is a 7,000 seat football stadium  to the east of the city. It is the home stadium for West Florence, Wilson, and South Florence high schools. There was an arena football team too, briefly, but its contract to play at the Florence Center was not renewed.

Hockey
Florence was also home to the Southern Professional Hockey League's now-Twin City Cyclones, who played from 2005 to 2007. This team was part of a two event package in 2004 to replace the now defunct Pee Dee Pride (to be the Myrtle Beach Thunderboltz) from the ECHL. The building was also the home of the South Carolina Fire Ants of Major League Roller Hockey in 1998.

Media
Florence and Grand Strand share a common defined market by Nielsen Media Research in Horry, Marion, Dillon, Darlington, Marlboro, Scotland, Robeson, and Florence counties. The Florence/Myrtle Beach Market is the 103rd largest market in the US as defined by Nielsen Media Research. CBS affiliate WBTW 13, ABC affiliate WPDE-TV 15, CW affiliate WPDE-DT2 15.2 and SCETV (PBS) outlet WJPM-TV 33 are licensed to Florence. SCETV's Myrtle Beach outlet, WHMC 23, is licensed to Conway. NBC affiliate WMBF-TV 32 and Fox affiliate WFXB 43 are licensed to the city of Myrtle Beach but also serve Florence. Florence, along with The Pee Dee Region, makes up the 217th largest radio market in the United States.

The Morning News is the largest daily paper published in the Pee Dee, with a readership base extending across several counties. The paper has been in existence since 1922 and is published by BH Media Group, a Berkshire Hathaway Company. The area is also served by several weekly papers, including the News Journal and the Community Times.

Cumulus Media and Iheart Media the largest and third-largest radio station ownership groups in the USA. Operate local outlets in Florence.

See also 

 List of municipalities in South Carolina

References

External links

 
 
 Official tourism website

 
Cities in South Carolina
County seats in South Carolina
Florence, South Carolina metropolitan area
Cities in Florence County, South Carolina